Frederick Rhead Heath (30 October 1894 – 19 September 1967) was an English cricketer who played first-class cricket for  Derbyshire in 1924 and 1925.

Heath was born at  Swadlincote, Derbyshire. He played minor counties cricket for Staffordshire between 1913 and 1921. During World War I he served with the Royal Artillery and was promoted from corporal to 2nd Lieutenant in 1915. He made his debut for Derbyshire against Gloucestershire in July 1924 when he took a wicket and a catch and made 13 in the only innings he played. He played two more matches in 1924 and one in 1925.

Heath played six innings in four first-class matches with an average of 4.40 and a top score of 17. He took three first-class wickets at an average of 15.88 and a best performance of 2 for 4.

Until 1928 Heath was in partnership with Charles Henry Heath as an earthenware manufacturer in the Hartshorne Pottery, Woodville, Derbyshire.

Heath died at Sutton, Seaford, Sussex at the age of 72. His brother John Heath also played for Derbyshire

References

1894 births
1967 deaths
Derbyshire cricketers
English cricketers
Staffordshire cricketers
People from Swadlincote
Cricketers from Derbyshire
British Army personnel of World War I
Royal Artillery officers